Jackpot is a 2015 Vietnamese comedy film directed by Dustin Nguyen. The film won the Golden Kite Prize and was selected as the Vietnamese entry for the Best Foreign Language Film at the 88th Academy Awards but it was not nominated.

Cast
 Ninh Dương Lan Ngọc as Thom
 Dustin Nguyen as Tu Nghia
 Chi Tai as Tu Phi

See also
 List of submissions to the 88th Academy Awards for Best Foreign Language Film
 List of Vietnamese submissions for the Academy Award for Best Foreign Language Film

References

External links
 

2015 films
2015 comedy films
Vietnamese comedy films
Vietnamese-language films